The First Methodist Church Christian Education Building is a historic religious educational facility at 1100 Central Avenue in Hot Springs, Arkansas.  It is located just south of the First United Methodist Church.  It is a two-story Modern L-shaped building, with the interior of the L defined by a curving two-story colonnade, which frames a small park between the southernmost part of the building and the adjacent church.  The street-facing facade of the building is adorned by a mosaic depicting Jesus Christ.  Built 1963–65 to a design to Arkansas architect I. Granger McDaniel, it is an excellent local example of Mid-Century Modern design.

The building was listed on the National Register of Historic Places in 2016.

See also
National Register of Historic Places listings in Garland County, Arkansas

References

Churches on the National Register of Historic Places in Arkansas
Churches completed in 1937
Churches in Garland County, Arkansas
Buildings and structures in Hot Springs, Arkansas
National Register of Historic Places in Hot Springs, Arkansas